Watchers of Rule is the sixth studio album by American metalcore band Unearth, released on October 28, 2014 by eOne Music in North America. This marks the first album since their debut The Stings of Conscience that does not feature long time bassist John "Slo" Maggard, also the first album to feature former The Faceless drummer Nick Pierce on drums.

The album entered the US Billboard 200 at No. 105, selling 3,950 copies in its first week.

It is the band's first release for eOne Music, for whom they signed in 2013. It is also the band's first studio album since 2001's The Stings of Conscience to not be released via Metal Blade Records.

Unearth announced in early 2012 that Nick Pierce had signed on as their full-time drummer. He officially replaced Derek Kerswill, who left the band in 2010, though Justin Foley provided drums for 2011's Darkness in the Light.

Album artwork was provided by Richey Beckett, who has also provided artwork for Converge, Baroness, Mastodon, and Metallica.

The band announced in April 2013 that they'd be working with Mark Lewis to record the then-titleless Watchers of Rule. Lewis had previously produced albums for bands such as The Black Dahlia Murder, Whitechapel, DevilDriver, and Deicide.

Track listing 

 "Spirit in Black" writing credits were taken from Seasons in the Abyss.

Credits 
Writing, performance and production credits are adapted from the album liner notes.

 Unearth
 Trevor Phipps – vocals
 Buz McGrath – lead guitar
 Ken Susi – rhythm guitar
 Nick Pierce – drums

 Guest musicians
 Mark Morton – bass

 Production
 Mark Lewis – producer, engineer, mixing, mastering
 Shane Frisby – additional vocal recording
 Ken Susi – additional vocal recording, additional guitar tracking
 Jeremy Krull – additional editing

 Artwork and design
 Jeremy Saffer – photography
 Richey Beckett – cover design
 Paul Grosso – creative direction
 Andrew Kelley – art direction

 Studios
 Audio Hammer Studios – vocals
 The Brick Hit House – additional vocals
 System Studios – additional vocals, guitars, drums

Charts

Release history

References

External links 
 

2014 albums
Unearth albums
E1 Music albums
Albums produced by Mark Lewis (music producer)